Sweet Girl is a 2021 American action thriller film directed by Brian Andrew Mendoza in his feature directorial debut and written by Philip Eisner and Gregg Hurwitz. The film stars Jason Momoa, Isabela Merced, Manuel Garcia-Rulfo, Adria Arjona, Raza Jaffrey, Justin Bartha, Lex Scott Davis, Michael Raymond-James and Amy Brenneman.

Sweet Girl was released on Netflix on August 20, 2021, and received negative reviews from critics for its clichéd story and wasted potential, but its stunts were positively noted.

Netflix announced in October 2021 that 68 million accounts had watched at least 2-minutes of the film within 28 days of release.

Plot 
In Pittsburgh, a woman named Amanda Cooper falls ill with a rare form of cancer. Her husband, the survival expert Ray Cooper, is told that a potentially life-saving drug for Amanda was pulled off the market days before her treatment was set to begin, due to BioPrime CEO Simon Keeley paying the manufacturer to delay production. Watching Keeley on a live debate with Congresswoman Diana Morgan, Ray calls in and threatens Keeley, saying if he doesn't reverse his decision, he'll kill him. Keeley doesn't take the threat seriously and Amanda passes away soon after, devastating Ray and their daughter, Rachel.

Six months later, Ray receives a call from a journalist, Martin Bennett, who tells him that he has evidence of criminal activity committed by BioPrime. They meet on a subway, unknowingly followed by Rachel and a hitman named Santos. Bennett explains that BioPrime has been bribing anyone who questions their dirty deeds, but before he can share his information, Santos stabs him dead. As the train stops at a station, Santos stabs Ray and knocks out Rachel, leaving them both on the platform to die. Two years later, Ray has been obsessively tracking Keeley's movements. Ray poses as a waiter to infiltrate BioPrime's charity auction so he can interrogate Keeley. Keeley says he knows nothing and tells him to go after BioPrime's chairman, Vinod Shah. After a brutal fight that leaves one of Keeley's bodyguards dead, Ray strangles him to death with a plastic bag.

Ray then gets Rachel and they hide in a motel outside of town. Rachel, concerned that her father has gone too far, contacts FBI Agent Sarah Meeker and tries to convince her to look into BioPrime. The next morning, two mercenaries break into the motel and Ray kills them both, resulting in further tension between him and Rachel. Ray plans to go after Shah and lets Rachel help him trap Shah. Ray tries to interrogate him, but Shah refuses to talk and is soon killed by Santos. Ray and Rachel meet with Santos in a diner, and after Santos admits that he finds himself sympathetic to Ray's cause, he reveals that Morgan is his real employer. He also tells Rachel that they will meet again soon.

Returning to the city, Ray is ambushed by the FBI and flees to the roof of PNC Park. As Meeker tries to talk him down, it's revealed that "Ray" is actually Rachel. Ray died from his wounds at the subway and Rachel, suffering from PTSD and dissociative identity disorder, devoted herself to finishing his quest for vengeance. She jumps into the Allegheny River, but gets knocked unconscious and put in an ambulance. After breaking free and crashing the vehicle, she locates Morgan's campaign office, where Santos is waiting. Despite him initially managing to subdue her by strangling and drowning her, Rachel is able to regain her strength and stabs Santos to death. She confronts Morgan and secretly records her admitting she was bribed by BioPrime for government contracts and that she ordered the hit on Bennett and Ray. Rachel flees and sends the recording to the FBI. In the aftermath, Morgan is arrested for her crimes, while Rachel obtains a fake passport, exchanges her money for cryptocurrency, and boards a plane to an uncertain future.

Cast
 Jason Momoa as Ray Cooper
 Isabela Merced as Rachel Cooper
 Milena Rivero as young Rachel Cooper
 Manuel Garcia-Rulfo as Amos Santos
 Amy Brenneman as Diana Morgan
Adria Arjona as Amanda Cooper
 Justin Bartha as Simon Keeley
 Raza Jaffrey as Vinod Shah
 Lex Scott Davis as FBI Agent Sarah Meeker
 Michael Raymond-James as FBI Agent John Rothman
 Dominic Fumusa as Sam Walker
 Nelson Franklin as Martin Bennett
 Will Blagrove as Detective Alvarez
 Katy O'Brian as TV Host
 Brian Howe as Pete Micelli
 Reggie Lee as Dr. Wu

Production 
In July 2019, it was announced Jason Momoa had joined the cast of the film, with Brian Andrew Mendoza directing from a screenplay by Philip Eisner, Gregg Hurwitz and Will Staples, Momoa will also serve as a producer on the film, with Netflix distributing. In October 2019, Isabela Merced joined the cast of the film. In December 2019, Manuel Garcia-Rulfo, Raza Jaffrey, Adria Arjona, Justin Bartha, Lex Scott Davis, Michael Raymond-James, Dominic Fumusa, Brian Howe, Nelson Franklin, and Reggie Lee joined the cast of the film.

Principal photography commenced on November 11, 2019 in Pittsburgh, Pennsylvania and wrapped on February 11, 2020.

Release
It was released on August 20, 2021 on Netflix.

Reception

On review aggregator website Rotten Tomatoes, the film holds an approval rating of 22% based on 55 reviews, with an average rating of 4.3/10. The website's critical consensus reads: "Burdened with action clichés and tripped up by a late plot twist, Sweet Girl wastes a potentially resonant story and some solid work from its well-matched leads." On Metacritic, the film has a weighted average score of 46 out of 100, based on 16 critics, indicating "mixed or average reviews".

References

External links
 

2021 action thriller films
2021 directorial debut films
2020s English-language films
American films about revenge
American action thriller films
Films about dissociative identity disorder
English-language Netflix original films
Films about father–daughter relationships
Films about cancer
Films scored by Steven Price
Films set in Pittsburgh
Films shot in Pittsburgh
2020s American films